This is a representative list of academic journals and magazines in engineering and its various subfields.

Aerospace engineering

 Aviation Week & Space Technology
 Flight International
 Journal of Astronomical Telescopes, Instruments, and Systems
 Space.com

Biomedical engineering

 Annual Review of Biomedical Engineering
 Biomechanics and Modeling in Mechanobiology
 Biomedical Microdevices
 Biotechnology and Bioengineering
 Biotechnology and Bioprocess Engineering
 Critical Reviews in Biomedical Engineering

Civil engineering
 Journal of Civil Engineering and Management

Chemical engineering

 Chemical & Engineering News
 Chemical Engineering
 Oil & Gas Journal
 Process Engineering

Electrical and electronic engineering

 EDN
 EE Times
 Electronic Design
 IEEE Spectrum
 IEEE Wireless Communications
 New Electronics
 Radioelectronics and Communications Systems

Mechanical engineering

Heat transfer, fluid flow, and energy
 Energy & Environment
 Energy-Safety and Energy-Economy
 International Journal for Numerical Methods in Fluids
 Journal of Fluid Mechanics

Solid mechanics
 International Journal of Fracture

Mining engineering

Acta Geotechnica
Engineering Geology
International Journal of Rock Mechanics and Mining Sciences
Journal of Mining Science
Mining Engineering

Nuclear engineering
Annals of Nuclear Energy
IEEE Transactions on Nuclear Science
Journal of Nuclear Materials
Plasma Physics and Controlled Fusion
Progress in Nuclear Energy

Structural engineering
 Computers and Structures Fire Safety Journal Structural and Multidisciplinary OptimizationHobby, practical and light engineering
 American Machinist Model Engineer Model Engineers' Workshop Modern Machine ShopOther areas

Mechatronics
 International Journal of Robotics ResearchPetroleum engineering
 Petroleum NewsWind turbine engineering
 Windpower MonthlyBy publisher

IET publications
The Institution of Engineering and Technology publishes various magazines and journals:
 Engineering and Technology Magazine IET Software''

IEEE publications

The Institute of Electrical and Electronics Engineers publishes various journals and magazines.

References

Lists of academic journals